Marine Parade Constituency was a single-member constituency in Marine Parade, Singapore. It was formed in 1976 after the land reclamation works to build Marine Parade were completed and carved out from Joo Chiat Constituency.

Goh Chok Tong made his political debut in the constituency when it was formed in 1976. He would later become the second Prime Minister of Singapore.

In 1988, the constituency was merged into Marine Parade Group Representation Constituency.

Member of Parliament

Elections

Elections in 1970s

Elections in the 1980s

References
1984 General Election's result
1980 General Election's result
1976 General Election's result

Singaporean electoral divisions
Ang Mo Kio